Robins is a city in Linn County, Iowa, United States. The population was 3,353 at the time of the 2020 census. It is a suburb of Cedar Rapids and part of the Cedar Rapids Metropolitan Statistical Area.

Geography
Robins is located at  (42.072916, -91.668538).

Demographics

2010 census
As of the census of 2010, there were 3,142 people, 1,034 households, and 911 families living in the city. The racial makeup of the city was 95.6% White, 0.7% African American, 0.1% Native American, 2.1% Asian, 0.1% Pacific Islander, 0.5% from other races, and 1.0% from two or more races. Hispanic or Latino of any race were 1.3% of the population.

There were 1,034 households, of which 46.5% had children under the age of 18 living with them, 83.8% were married couples living together, 1.8% had a female householder with no husband present, 2.4% had a male householder with no wife present, and 11.9% were non-families. 8.6% of all households were made up of individuals, and 3.5% had someone living alone who was 65 years of age or older. The average household size was 3.04 and the average family size was 3.23.

The median age in the city was 39.1 years. 31.1% of residents were under the age of 18; 4.7% were between the ages of 18 and 24; 24.5% were from 25 to 44; 31.6% were from 45 to 64; and 8% were 65 years of age or older. The gender makeup of the city was 51.1% male and 48.9% female.

2000 census
As of the census of 2000, there were 1,806 people, 592 households, and 520 families living in the city. The racial makeup of the city was 98.17% White, 0.17% Native American, 0.50% Asian, 0.11% from other races, and 1.05% from two or more races. Hispanic or Latino of any race were 1.38% of the population.

There were 592 households, out of which 46.5% had children under the age of 18 living with them, 83.6% were married couples living together, 2.2% had a female householder with no husband present, and 12.0% were non-families. 9.3% of all households were made up of individuals, and 1.9% had someone living alone who was 65 years of age or older. The average household size was 3.05 and the average family size was 3.27.

In the city, the population was spread out, with 33.0% under the age of 18, 4.5% from 18 to 24, 30.5% from 25 to 44, 26.5% from 45 to 64, and 5.6% who were 65 years of age or older. The median age was 37 years. For every 100 females, there were 109.8 males. For every 100 females age 18 and over, there were 108.6 males.

The median income for a household in the city was $74,211, and the median income for a family was $76,666. Males had a median income of $51,520 versus $33,500 for females. The per capita income for the city was $25,078. About 0.4% of families and 1.2% of the population were below the poverty line, including 1.2% of those under age 18 and none of those age 65 or over.

Education
Most of Robins is in the Cedar Rapids Community School District.

Zoned schools for Robins:
 Elementary schools: Hiawatha and Nixon elementaries in Hiawatha
 Secondary schools: Harding Middle School and Kennedy High School

References

External links 
 City Data Statistical Data and more about Robins, Iowa

Cities in Linn County, Iowa
Cities in Iowa
Cedar Rapids, Iowa metropolitan area